New York's 95th State Assembly district is one of the 150 districts in the New York State Assembly. It has been represented by Dana Levenberg since 2023, succeeding Sandy Galef.

Geography

2020s
District 95 contains portions of Westchester and Putnam counties. It includes the towns of Cortlandt, Croton-on-Hudson, Ossining, Peekskill, Philipstown, and Cold Spring.

2010s
District 95 contains portions of Westchester and Putnam counties. It includes the towns of Cortlandt, Croton-on-Hudson, Ossining, Peekskill, Philipstown, Cold Spring, and Kent.

Recent election results

2022

2020

2018

2016

2014

2012

References

95
Westchester County, New York
Putnam County, New York